Self-Realization Fellowship (SRF) is a worldwide, spiritual organization founded by Paramahansa Yogananda in 1920 and legally incorporated in the United States as a non-profit religious organization in 1935.  Before coming to the United States, Yogananda began his spiritual work in India in 1917 and named it Yogoda Satsanga Society of India (YSS). He then founded SRF in 1920 which became the international headquarters for the SRF and YSS, located on Mount Washington in Los Angeles, California.

Yogananda's teachings include yoga techniques and a form of meditation that promotes awareness of ones soul and expands ones consciousness. Self-Realization Fellowship disseminates and publishes his teachings, which are guided by his Aims and Ideals. SRF also coordinates the Worldwide Prayer Circle, which it describes as a network of groups and individuals who pray for those in need of physical, mental, or spiritual aid, and who also pray for world peace and harmony.

Governance
Paramahansa Yogananda founded the Self-Realization Fellowship (SRF) in 1920 and served as head until his death in March 1952.

The first president and head of SRF/YSS after Yogananda was Rajarsi Janakananda, who was president until his death in February 1955.

Daya Mata was the next head and president of Self Realization Fellowship/YSS from 1955 until her death on 30 November 2010. According to Linda Johnsen in Today's Woman in World Religions, the new wave today is women, as many major Indian gurus have passed on their spiritual mantle to women, such as Yogananda to the American born Daya Mata and then to Mrinalini Mata.

In 2010, Mrinalini Mata became the next president of SRF/YSS, with an official announcement on 9 January 2011, holding this position until her death on 3 August 2017. She was "one of the close disciples of Paramahansa Yogananda personally chosen and trained by him to help guide his society after his passing." Mrinalini Mata had held the position of SRF/YSS vice-president from 1966 until she became president in 2011.

On 30 August 2017, Brother Chidananda was elected as the next and current president with a unanimous vote of the SRF Board of Directors.

SRF also has a sister organization in India called Yogoda Satsanga Society of India, founded by Yogananda in 1917, and headquartered in Dakshineswar (near Calcutta). YSS oversees 200 kendras, mandalis, retreats, and ashrams throughout India and Nepal, including meditation centers, 21 educational institutions, and a variety of charitable facilities.

Teachings

Yogananda first introduced his teachings during an international congress of religious leaders held in Boston, MA in 1920 while giving a talk called The Science of Religion. Yogananda believed that his methods were testable.

Yogananda's dissemination of his teachings is continued through his organization – the Self-Realization Fellowship (SRF) / Yogoda Satsanga Society of India (YSS). His teachings include: his home-study lessons, writings including his autobiography, lectures, and recorded talks; oversees temples, retreats, meditation centers, and monastic communities bearing the name Self-Realization Order. Yogananda wrote his Aims and Ideals as a guide for students of Self-Realization Fellowship /Yogoda Satsanga Society. 

Yogananda wrote in God Talks With Arjuna: The Bhagavad Gita that the science of Kriya Yoga was given to Manu, the original Adam, and through him to Janaka and other royal sages.

Temples, retreats, and other facilities
 

Self-Realization Fellowship has over 500 temples, retreats, ashrams, centers, and meditation circles around the world. In the U.S., there are seven temples in California: Berkeley, Glendale, Hollywood, Fullerton, Encinitas, Pacific Palisades, and San Diego as well as a temple in Phoenix. 
There are retreat centers in Pacific Palisades, (Lake Shrine), Encinitas CA, Valley Center, CA (Hidden Valley Ashram, for men only) Greenfield, VA (Front Royal), Bermersbach, Germany and Armação, Brazil. There are meditation centers and circles located in 54 countries. 

Encinitas. After his return from India in 1936, Paramahansa Yogananda took up residence at the SRF hermitage in Encinitas, California which was a surprise gift from his disciple Rajarsi Janakananda. It was while at this hermitage that Yogananda wrote Autobiography of a Yogi and other writings plus creating an "enduring foundation for the spiritual and humanitarian work of Self‑Realization Fellowship/Yogoda Satsanga Society of India." This property now includes an ashram and a retreat center. A main temple and an overflow temple are nearby on Second St.

Hollywood. On August 30, 1942 Yogananda formally opened the SRF Hollywood Temple on Sunset Blvd., Hollywood, California which is the oldest SRF temple in the US. According to Phil Goldberg, Yogananda dedicated it to "the ideal of human brotherhood and the definite realization of God as the One Father of all mankind."  Meghan Markle's parents, Doria Ragland and Thomas Markle Sr. were married by Brother Bhaktananda at Paramahansa Yogananda's Self-Realization Fellowship temple in Hollywood, California on 23 December 1979.

Pacific Palisades.  The Self-Realization Fellowship Lake Shrine is located on Sunset Boulevard in Pacific Palisades, California. It was dedicated by Yogananda, on 20 August 1950. This 10-acre spiritual center is dedicated to five major world religions. It is set in a hillside amphitheater, has gardens, a spring-fed lake, and is home to swans, ducks, koi, water turtles, lotus flowers, a Dutch windmill and a golden lotus archway, painted white topped with gold lotus blossoms. The archway frames the Mahatma Gandhi World Peace Memorial, an outdoor shrine where an authentic 1,000-year-old Chinese stone sarcophagus holds a portion of the ashes of Mahatma Gandhi.

San Diego.  Paramahansa Yogananda established a temple on Bankers Hill, San Diego on 5 September 1943, during the conflict of World War II. The front walkway of the temple is lined with cypress trees planted by Yogananda. He dedicated the Temple as a Church of All Religions with the following prayer: 
In 1945, Mrinilini Mata, then fourteen year old Merna Brown, first met Yogananda at this temple and a year later entered the ashram in Encinitas.

Twentynine Palms. Yogananda spent most of the last four years of his life in seclusion at his desert ashram in Twentynine Palms, California with some of his inner circle of disciples. There he completed his legacy of writings, including the revisions of his books, articles and lessons written previously.

Self-Realization Fellowship Order
The Self-Realization Fellowship Order is the monastic order associated with Self-Realization Fellowship. Monks and Nuns of the Self-Realization Fellowship Order work in the ashrams and temples of the Self-Realization Fellowship, and teach others about the Fellowship and about Kriya Yoga. According to their website:

The SRF renunciant's daily schedule may vary depending on the particular ashram center and area of work to which he or she is assigned, but includes meditation and prayer, service, spiritual study and introspection, exercise and recreation, and time for solitude and silence. There are four stages of monastic life in the Self-Realization Fellowship monastic order, representing a gradual deepening commitment to the renunciant life and the monastic vows: postulancy, novitiate, brahmacarya, and sannyas. Monks and nuns of the Self-Realization Fellowship Order who take their final renunciant vows are members of the Swami Order, which traces its spiritual lineage back to Adi Shankara. Paramahansa Yogananda established the SRF monastic order in the early 1930s.

Reception
According to Straight Arrow Press, in the United States the "proceeds from the January 14, 2002, reissue of George Harrison's 1970 song My Sweet Lord will go to the Self-Realization Fellowship, a California organization that promotes the teachings of Paramahansa Yogananda."
Yogananda, who established the fellowship in 1920 to spread his philosophy of yoga and meditation, is best known for his Autobiography of a Yogi. He was frequently cited by Harrison as an important spiritual influence."

Ravi Shankar had met the Self-Realization Fellowship founder Yogananda in the 1930s and gave his first U.S. concert at the SRF Encinitas Retreat, Encinitas, California in 1957. On visits to Los Angeles, George Harrison would spend time at the SRF retreat in Encinitas. The SRF organization strictly honored its members' privacy which Harrison appreciated.

Elvis Presley often visited the Self-Realization Fellowship in the late 1960s. According to Louis Sahagun of the LA Times, Brother Paramananda, "who left a promising acting career to devote his life to the fellowship," claimed Elvis had once said to him "Man, you made the right choice. People don't know my life or that I sometimes cry myself to sleep because I don't know God."

Elliot Miller of Christian Research Institute (CRI), which is run by Protestant Evangelical Christians, believes that SRF promotes a kind of New Age Hinduism in Christian garb.

Philip Goldberg, author of the book American Veda, wrote that hundreds of thousands of seekers have taken to Yogananda's teachings because they have improved their lives.

In 1990 SRF filed suit against James Donald Walters (aka Kriyananda) and Walter's (then called) Church of Self-Realization regarding Ananda changing its name to Church of Self-Realization and on issues regarding specific writings, photographs and recordings of Paramahansa Yogananda. According to Louis Sahagún of the Los Angeles Times, SRF wanted "to secure exclusive rights to Yogananda's teachings, name, likeness, voice and use of the term 'self-realization'." The litigation lasted for around twelve years (1990–2002) and in 2002 the final jury trial was held in the US District Court for the Eastern District of California. Jurors ultimately agreed with Self-Realization Fellowship's argument that Yogananda had repeatedly made his intentions clear before dying – he wanted the Fellowship to maintain copyrights to his works. It also determined that the terms Paramahansa Yogananda and self-realization could not be trademarked.

Awake: The Life of Yogananda documentary
In 2014 the fellowship commissioned two independent, American filmmakers, Paola di Florio and Lisa Leeman to direct Awake: The Life of Yogananda, a biography about Paramahansa Yogananda. It was filmed for over three years with the participation of 30 countries around the world. The film was shown in theaters in the U.S. in 2014–15.

Bibliography

See also 
 Lahiri Mahasaya
 Yukteswar Giri

References

Further reading

External links

 
 

Hindu new religious movements
International Hindu organizations
New religious movements
Yoga organizations
Paramahansa Yogananda
Religious buildings and structures in Los Angeles
Mount Washington, Los Angeles
Non-profit organizations based in Los Angeles
Religious organizations established in 1920
1920 establishments in California